IP over DVB implies that Internet Protocol datagrams are distributed using some digital television system, for example DVB-H, DVB-T, DVB-S, DVB-C or their successors like DVB-S2. This may take the form of IP over MPEG, where the datagrams are transferred over the MPEG transport stream, or the datagrams may be carried in the DVB baseband frames directly, as in GSE.

Application examples
 Data broadcast (datacast), for example a data carousel sending programme information and media over and over again.
 IP multicast, for sending media efficiently to a limited group of subscribing users, using only the transmitter towers where users for the moment are situated.
 interactive TV services
 To provide internet access by utilizing the DVB system as a broadband downlink, in combination with some narrow-band duplex system. Examples:
 Satellite Internet access, e.g. to buildings in the countryside, using a telephone modem as the back-channel
 Broadband Internet access to trains
 Mobile broadband internet access to cellular phones including a mobile TV receiver, for example a DVB-H receiver.

Return channels
All services except the first requires some kind of return channel.
 DVB-RCT (DVB return channel terrestrial)
 POTS modems
 ADSL
 GPRS
 3G
 DOCSIS (Cable Modems)

Protocols for IP over DVB base band frames
 Generic Stream Encapsulation (GSE), ETSI TS 102 606: "Digital Video Broadcasting (DVB); Generic Stream Encapsulation (GSE) Protocol", European Telecommunications Standard Institute (ETSI)

Protocols for IP over MPEG transport stream
 MPEG Multiprotocol encapsulation (MPE), or ETSI-DAT. EN 301 192, "Specifications for Data Broadcasting", European Telecommunications Standards Institute(ETSI), 2004.
 MPEG Unidirectional Lightweight Encapsulation (ULE) (RFC 4326)
 Unidirectional link (UDE)
 DVB-H IP datacasting IPDC

DVB-IPTV 
DVB-IPTV is an open DVB standard that enables Audio/Video services to be delivered to and through the home via Internet Protocol networking. DVB-IPTV was formerly known as DVB-IPI.

See also
 DVB-MHP (Multimedia Home Platform)

References

External links

DVB Specifications (Standards & BlueBooks)

Interactive television
Digital Video Broadcasting